Stefanie Antonia Sanders (born 12 June 1998) is a German footballer who plays as a forward for Frauen-Bundesliga side Werder Bremen. She is a former Germany youth international.

Club career
A youth product of the club, Sanders made her senior debut with Werder Bremen.

In January 2019, she joined Frauen-Bundesliga club SC Freiburg from UCF Knights.

She moved to Damallsvenskan side FC Rosengård in January 2021.

In January 2023, Sanders returned to former club Werder Bremen from FC Rosengård.

International career
Sanders has represented Germany at internationally at youth levels U15 through U20. She played at the 2016 FIFA U-20 Women's World Cup in Papua New Guinea, helping the Germany U20 reach the quarterfinals and scoring three goals in the group stage.

References

External links
 

Living people
1998 births
German women's footballers
Women's association football forwards
Frauen-Bundesliga players
Damallsvenskan players
SV Werder Bremen (women) players
UCF Knights women's soccer players
SC Freiburg (women) players
 FC Rosengård players
German expatriate women's footballers
German expatriate sportspeople in Sweden
Expatriate women's footballers in Sweden
German expatriate sportspeople in the United States
Expatriate women's soccer players in the United States